Jewel Franklin Guy (July 26, 1926 – April 6, 2015), known professionally as James Best, was an American television, film, stage, and voice actor, as well as a writer, director, acting coach, artist, college professor, and musician. During a career that spanned more than 60 years, he performed not only in feature films but also in scores of television series, as well as appearing on various country music programs and talk shows. Television audiences, however, perhaps most closely associate Best with his role as the bumbling Sheriff Rosco P. Coltrane in the action-comedy series The Dukes of Hazzard, which originally aired on CBS between 1979 and 1985. He reprised the role in 1997 and 2000 for the made-for-television movies The Dukes of Hazzard: Reunion! and The Dukes of Hazzard: Hazzard in Hollywood (2000).

Early years
Best was born on July 26, 1926, in Powderly, Kentucky, to Lark and Lena (née Everly) Guy. Lena Guy's brother was Ike Everly, the father of the pop duo the Everly Brothers. After his mother died of tuberculosis in 1929, then three-year-old James was sent to live in an orphanage. He was later adopted by Armen Best and his wife, Essa Myrtle ( Knowland) and went to live with them in Corydon, Indiana. 

Best served in the United States Army Air Forces in World War II, training in 1944 in Biloxi, Mississippi, as a gunner on a B-17 bomber; but by the time he completed his training the war had almost ended, so he was assigned to the army's law enforcement section. In the military police, as an "MP", Best served in war-torn Germany immediately after the Nazi government's surrender in May 1945. While stationed in Germany, Best soon transferred from the military police to an army unit of actors, who traveled around Europe performing plays for troops. Those experiences formed the beginning of his acting career.

Film career
Best began his contract career in 1949 at Universal Studios, where he met fellow actors Julie Adams, Piper Laurie, Tony Curtis, Mamie Van Doren and Rock Hudson. Initially, he performed in several uncredited roles for Universal, such as in the 1950 film One Way Street, but credited performances soon followed that same year in the Westerns Comanche Territory, Winchester '73, and Kansas Raiders. Work in that genre continued to be an important part of his ongoing film career, including roles in The Cimarron Kid (1952), Seven Angry Men (1955) in which he portrays one of the sons of abolitionist John Brown, Last of the Badmen (1957), Cole Younger Gunfighter (1958), Ride Lonesome (1959), The Quick Gun (1964), and Firecreek (1968). Yet Best's film roles were not limited to Westerns. He also starred in the 1959 science fiction cult movie The Killer Shrews and in its 2012 sequel Return of the Killer Shrews, as army medic Rhidges in the 1958 film adaptation of Norman Mailer's The Naked and the Dead, as escaped POW Carter in the James Stewart classic Shenandoah, as Dr. Ben Mizer in the 1966 comedy Three on a Couch, and as the cross-dressing Dewey Barksdale in the 1976 drama Ode to Billy Joe. He also played Burt Reynolds’s partner Cully in the 1978 movie “Hooper”.

Television

Best guest-starred more than 280 times in various television series. In 1954, he played outlaw Dave Ridley in an episode of Stories of the Century. In 1954, Best appeared twice on the syndicated Annie Oakley series. In 1955, he played Jim Blake on The Lone Ranger, Season 4, Episode 47. He was cast in the religion anthology series Crossroads, in its 1956 episode "The White Carnation." He was also cast on an episode of the NBC sitcom The People's Choice and in the crime drama Richard Diamond, Private Detective.

Best made four appearances on the syndicated anthology series Death Valley Days. His first role was as miner "Tiny" Stoker in the 1955 episode "Million Dollar Wedding".

In 1960, Best appeared in the episode "Love on Credit" of CBS's anthology series The DuPont Show with June Allyson.  The same year, he guest-starred on The Andy Griffith Show as "The Guitar Player" (Season 1, Episode 3 and 31).  He starred in three episodes of The Twilight Zone including "The Grave" (Season 3, Episode 7), "The Last Rites of Jeff Myrtlebank," (Season 3, Episode 23) and "Jess-Belle" (Season 4, Episode 7). In 1961 he guest-starred in the Alfred Hitchcock Presents episode "Make My Death Bed". In 1963, he was cast as the courageous Wisconsin game warden Ernie Swift in the episode "Open Season" of another CBS anthology series, GE True, hosted by Jack Webb. In the story line, Swift faces the reprisal of organized crime after he tickets gangster Frank MacErlane (David McLean) for illegal fishing.

In 1962, he played the part of Art Fuller in the episode "Incident of El Toro" on CBS's Rawhide; and in 1963, he returned to play Willie Cain in the episode "Incident at Spider Rock."  Best made two guest appearances on Perry Mason. In 1963 he played title character Martin Potter in "The Case of the Surplus Suitor," and in 1966 he played defendant and oilman Allan Winford in "The Case of the Unwelcome Well."  He appeared on a long list of other television series in the 1950s and 1960s, including Wagon Train (three times), Laramie (three times), The Adventures of Kit Carson (twice as Henry Jordan), the western anthology series Frontier (twice), The Rebel, Bonanza, Sheriff of Cochise, Pony Express, Rescue 8, The Texan, Gunsmoke, Have Gun – Will Travel, The Barbara Stanwyck Show, Tombstone Territory, Whispering Smith, Trackdown, The Rifleman, Cheyenne, Stagecoach West, Wanted: Dead or Alive, Overland Trail, Bat Masterson, Alfred Hitchcock Presents, Combat!, The Green Hornet ("Deadline For Death"), The Mod Squad, I Spy, The Fugitive and Flipper. He made a guest appearance on Honey West "A Matter of Wife and Death" (episode 4) in 1965.

The Dukes of Hazzard
Best's highest-profile role was as Sheriff Rosco P. Coltrane on CBS's The Dukes of Hazzard. He appeared during the entire run of the program, from 1979 until the end of the series in 1985. He later revealed that the caricature-like persona of Sheriff Coltrane was developed from a voice he used when playing with his young children. On set, Best was particularly close to Sorrell Booke, who played the character of Boss Hogg, who was both the boss and the brother-in-law of Rosco. The two actors became close friends; and according to interviews by the series' creators, the two often improvised their scenes together, making up their own dialogue as they went along. Until his death, he also remained close to Catherine Bach, who played the character of Daisy Duke; and long after the show's cancellation, she was a regular visitor to the website dedicated to Best's painting.

Later television career
In 1991, Best appeared in an episode of the NBC crime drama In the Heat of the Night. He portrayed retired sheriff and repentant killer Nathan Bedford in the episode "Sweet, Sweet Blues."

In August 2008, Best was presented the Florida Motion Picture and Television Association's Lifetime Achievement Award.

Artist, teacher, writer, and other activities
Best later moved to Florida and taught at the University of Central Florida (Orlando). After semi-retiring, he administered a production company and accepted occasional acting roles. He also developed a reputation as an artist for his paintings of landscapes, scenes from The Dukes of Hazzard in collaboration with Scott Romine, and other subjects. Later, after residing for a while on Lake Murray near Columbia, South Carolina, he moved once again, this time to Hickory, North Carolina. 

An acting coach too, Best taught drama and acting techniques for more than 25 years in Los Angeles. He also served as artist-in-residence and taught drama at the University of Mississippi (Oxford) for two years prior to his stint on The Dukes of Hazzard. 

On November 9, 2014, Best and fellow actor Robert Fuller (along with their wives) attended the 100th birthday celebration of lifelong friend and fellow actor Norman Lloyd. Best said, "I had the honor to have been directed by Norman in a Hitchcock episode called 'The Jar.' Having worked with hundreds of directors in my career, I found very few that had Norman's qualities. He was most kind, gracious and patient with his actors. He is in all respects a complete gentleman in his personal life and I found it a genuine pleasure just to be in the presence of such a talented man. I am also doubly honored to consider him my friend. We are so blessed to have such a man among us for so long."

Personal life
Best had a son, Gary, with his first wife. In 1959, Best married his second wife, Jobee Ayers. The couple had two daughters, Janeen and JoJami, before divorcing in 1977. Janeen is an actress, screenwriter and producer, first as Janeen Best then as Janeen Damian, after her 1998 marriage to actor and producer Michael Damian. Best married his third wife, Dorothy Collier, in 1986. He had three grandchildren.

He enjoyed a wide range of hobbies and interests. He was an accomplished painter, a guitarist, and a black belt in karate; enjoyed writing; and ran his own acting school. His students included Lindsay Wagner, Roger Miller, Glen Campbell, Quentin Tarantino, and Regis Philbin. He was also an animal rights advocate.

Death
Best died on April 6, 2015, at the age of 88, in Hickory, North Carolina, from complications of pneumonia.

Prior to his death, Best's former Dukes of Hazzard co-star and longtime friend John Schneider said: "I laughed and learned more from Jimmie in one hour than from anyone else in a whole year." He also added that, when asked to cry for the camera, "(Best) would say, 'sure thing, which eye?' I'm forever thankful to have cut my teeth in the company of such a fine man." Nearly one year after Best's death, Schneider said about his working relationship with Best:

Filmography

One Way Street (1950) as Driver (uncredited)
Comanche Territory (1950) as Sam
I Was a Shoplifter (1950) as Police Broadcaster in Surveillance Plane (uncredited)
Winchester '73 (1950) as Crater
Peggy (1950) as Frank Addison
Kansas Raiders (1950) as Cole Younger
Target Unknown (1951) as Sgt. Ralph Phelps
Air Cadet (1951) as Jerry Connell
Apache Drums (1951) as Bert Keon
Abbott and Costello Meet the Invisible Man (1951) as Tommy Nelson (Arthur Franz's stand-in)
The Cimarron Kid (1952) as Bitter Creek Dalton
About Face (1952) as Joe – Hal's Roommate
Steel Town (1952) as Joe Rakich
The Battle at Apache Pass (1952) as Cpl. Hassett
Ma and Pa Kettle at the Fair (1952) as Marvin Johnson
Francis Goes to West Point (1952) as Cpl. Ransom
Flat Top (1952) as Radio Operator (uncredited)
Seminole (1953) as Corp. Gerard
Column South (1953) as Primrose
The President's Lady (1953) as Samuel Donelson (uncredited)
The Beast from 20,000 Fathoms (1953) as Charlie – Radar Man (uncredited)
City of Bad Men (1953) as Deputy Gig (uncredited)
Riders to the Stars (1954) as Sidney K. Fuller
The Yellow Tomahawk (1954) as Private Bliss
The Caine Mutiny (1954) as Lieutenant Jorgensen (uncredited)
Return from the Sea (1954) as Barr
The Raid (1954) as Lt. Robinson
They Rode West (1954) as Lt. Finlay (uncredited)
Seven Angry Men (1955) as Jason Brown
A Man Called Peter (1955) as Man with Jane at Youth Rally (uncredited)
The Eternal Sea (1955) as Student
Death Valley Days (TV Series, 4 episodes, 1955–1964) as Tiny Stoker / Ruel Gridley / Jimmy Burns / Jim Campbell
Top of the World (1955) as Col. French's Orderly (uncredited)
Come Next Spring (1956) as Bill Jackson
The Adventures of Champion (1955–1956, TV Series) as Mace Kincaid / Paul Kenyon
When Gangland Strikes (1956) as Jerry Ames (uncredited)
Forbidden Planet (1956) as Crewman (uncredited)
Gaby (1956) as Jim
Calling Homicide (1956) as Arnie Arnholf
The Rack (1956) as Millard Chilson Cassidy
Last of the Badmen (1957) as Ted Hamilton
Hot Summer Night (1957) as Kermit
I Was a Teenage Werewolf (1957) as Kid at party who gets slapped (uncredited)
Man on the Prowl (1957) as Doug Gerhardt
Have Gun – Will Travel (1957–1961, TV Series) as Roy Smith / Andy Fisher, one of three parties in danger of being hanged, along with Richard Boone and guest star Richard Schallert
Cole Younger, Gunfighter (1958) as Kit Caswell
The Restless Gun (1958) in Episode "Jebediah Bonner"
The Left Handed Gun (1958) as Tom Folliard
Bat Masterson (1958) as Joe Best (murderer)
The Naked and the Dead (1958) as Pvt. Rhidges
Trackdown (1957–1958, TV Series) as Joe Sunday / Bud Ehlers / Rand Marple
Ride Lonesome (1959) as Billy John
Verboten! (1959) as Sgt. David Brent
The Killer Shrews (1959) as Thorne Sherman
Cast a Long Shadow (1959) as Sam Mullen
Wagon Train (1959–1960, TV Series) as Art Bernard / Bowman Lewis / Garth English
The Mountain Road (1960) as Niergaard
The Andy Griffith Show (1960–1961, TV Series) as Jim Lindsey
Alfred Hitchcock Presents (1958–1961, TV Series) as Bish Darby / Hennessy / Norman Frayne
The Rifleman (1962, TV Series) as Bob Barrett
Bronco (1962, TV Series) as Frankie Banton
Cheyenne (1962, TV Series) as Ernie Riggins
Black Gold (1962) as Jericho Larkin
The Twilight Zone (1961–1963, TV Series) as Billy Ben Turner / Jeff Myrtlebank / Johnny Rob
Shock Corridor (1963) as Stuart Couter
The Fugitive (1963, TV Series) as Dan Murray
Combat! (1964, TV Series) as Trenton
 The Quick Gun (1964) as Sheriff Scotty Grant
Flipper (1965, TV Series) as Dr. Peter Kellwin
Black Spurs (1965) as Sheriff Ralph Elkins
Shenandoah (1965) as Carter
The Virginian (1965, TV series) as Curt Westley
Daniel Boone (1965) as Wyatt in S1/E21 "The Devil's Four"
Three on a Couch (1966) as Dr. Ben Mizer
Perry Mason (1963–1966, TV Series) as Allan Winford / Martin Potter
First to Fight (1967) as Gunnery Sgt. Ed Carnavan
Firecreek (1968) as Drew
Bonanza (1961–1968, TV Series, three episodes) as Sheriff Vern Schaler / Page / Carl Reagan
The Guns of Will Sonnett (1967–1969, TV Series) as Harley Bass / Rake Hanley
Gunsmoke (1963–1969, TV Series) as Charlie Noon / Beal / Dal Creed
Sounder (1972) as Sheriff Charlie Young
Hawkins (1973, TV Series)
Savages (1974, TV Movie) as Sheriff Bert Hamilton
Ode to Billy Joe (1976) as Dewey Barksdale
Gator (1976)
Nickelodeon (1976) as Jim
Rolling Thunder (1977) as Texan
The Brain Machine (1977) as Rev. Emory Neill
The End (1978) as Pacemaker Patient
Hooper (1978) as Cully
Centennial (1978, TV Mini-Series) as Hank Garvey
The Dukes of Hazzard (1979–1985, TV Series) as Sheriff Rosco P. Coltrane
Enos (1981, TV series) (Horse Cops) as Sheriff Rosco P. Coltrane  
The Dukes (1983, TV Series) as Sheriff Rosco P. Coltrane
In the Heat of the Night (1991, TV Series) as retired Sheriff Nathan Bedford – Crystal Reel Award, Best Actor
The Dukes of Hazzard: Reunion! (1997, TV Movie) as Sheriff Rosco P. Coltrane
Raney (1997) as Uncle Nate
Death Mask (1998) as Wilbur Johnson
The Dukes of Hazzard: Hazzard in Hollywood (2000, TV Movie) as Rosco P. Coltrane
Hot Tamale (2006) as Hank Larson
Moondance Alexander (2007) as a friend and storekeeper of the Alexanders (based on the life of real-life daughter Janeen)
Return of the Killer Shrews (2012) as Thorne Sherman
The Sweeter Side of Life (2013, TV Movie) as the father of the protagonist (final film role)

Further reading
Best, James; Clark, Jim (2009).  Best in Hollywood: The Good, The Bad, And The Beautiful.  Albany, New York:  BearManor Media, 2009;  .

References

External links

 
 
 
 James Best Bio at HazzardNet.com
 James Best Crystal Reel Awards
 Obituary – Legacy
 

1926 births
2015 deaths
American male film actors
American male television actors
American male voice actors
20th-century American male actors
Male Western (genre) film actors
Male actors from Kentucky
United States Army Air Forces personnel of World War II
Universal Pictures contract players
University of Central Florida faculty
University of Mississippi faculty
People from Muhlenberg County, Kentucky
People from Corydon, Indiana
Male actors from Orlando, Florida
Military personnel from Kentucky
Deaths from pneumonia in North Carolina
Western (genre) television actors
American military police officers